During the 2005–06 English football season, Ipswich Town competed in the Football League Championship.

Season summary
Although Ipswich had been pre-season promotion favourites for the 2005–06 season, they finished 15th, the club's lowest finish in the English football pyramid since 1966, and Joe Royle resigned on 11 May 2006.

First-team squad

Left club during season

Reserve squad

Pre-season
Ipswich spent time on a pre-season tour of Hungary in July 2005 as part of preparations for the 2005–06 season.

Legend

Competitions

Football League Championship

League table

Legend

Ipswich Town's score comes first

Matches

FA Cup

League Cup

Transfers

Transfers in

Loans in

Transfers out

Loans out

Squad statistics
All statistics updated as of end of season

Appearances and goals

|-
! colspan=14 style=background:#dcdcdc; text-align:center| Goalkeepers

|-
! colspan=14 style=background:#dcdcdc; text-align:center| Defenders

|-
! colspan=14 style=background:#dcdcdc; text-align:center| Midfielders

|-
! colspan=14 style=background:#dcdcdc; text-align:center| Forwards

|-
! colspan=14 style=background:#dcdcdc; text-align:center| Players transferred out during the season

Goalscorers

Clean sheets

Disciplinary record

Starting 11
Considering starts in all competitions

Awards

Player awards

References

Ipswich Town F.C. seasons
Ipswich Town